The women's high jump competition of the athletics events at the 1979 Pan American Games took place on 13 July at the Estadio Sixto Escobar. The defending Pan American Games champion was Joni Huntley of the United States.

Records
Prior to this competition, the existing world and Pan American Games records were as follows:

Results
All heights shown are in meters.

Final

References

Athletics at the 1979 Pan American Games
1979